Connectivity refers broadly to social connections forged through mediated communications systems. That is, 'since the arrival of the World Wide Web and the spread of mobile communications, mediated connectivity has been quietly normalized as central to a consolidating ‘global imaginary’ One aspect of this is the ability of the social media to accumulate economic capital from the users' connections and activities on social media platforms by using certain mechanisms in their architecture. According to several scholars (van Dijck and Poell) "it is a key element of social media logic, having a material and metaphorical importance in social media culture".This concept originates from the technological term of "connectivity" but its application to the media field has acquired additional social and cultural implications. The increasing role of social media in everyday life serves as the basis of such connectivity in the 21st century. It shows the interrelations between the users activities on social media and at the same time the empowerment of the social media platforms with the data that was produced by the users and given to those services for granted.

Notion of connectivity
Connectivity developed with the rise of the Internet, first with the introduction Web 1.0 and later Web 2.0. New improvements in equipment, software, the advancement of speed and access have increased the level and quality of connectivity. Along with these improvements, new media such as social networking systems (e.g. Facebook, Twitter, Google+), websites that provide access to user-generated content (e.g. Youtube, Myspace, Flickr), trading and marketing sites (e.g. Amazon, eBay, Groupon) and also game sites (e.g. FarmVille, The Sims Social) have become an essential part of everyday life of an average user: "Just as electricity in the 19th and 20th centuries transformed societies by penetrating every fibre of people’s personal and professional lives, network connectivity is probably the most powerful transformative force in early 21st-century cultures". This made a shift in the understanding of the nature of connectivity and moved the initial focus just from a technical side of the notion to its increasingly acquired techno-socio-cultural character. 

As mentioned before, connectivity is built on the principles of Web 2.0. that promote an openness, create the vision of empowerment of the user in the generation of a new content and coordination of the information flow on the Internet. These mechanisms encourage staying in touch with each other despite distances and share as much data as possible. According to Youngs, the development of the Internet has resulted in the deeper permeation of ICTs into public and private spheres of peoples' life, their relationships and spheres of identity. Hence, connectivity becomes a resource of maintaining these activities. However, van Dijck notices that this connectivity is not just a neutral feature of new media, but is manufactured by the combination of human and technological resources, where the role of technologies is intransparent. Algorithms and protocols that are part of such platforms prompt users activities and online experiences on social media platforms. One of the most prominent activities on social media includes sharing and as Kennedy argues, "sharing rhetoric draws on a cultural image of connectivity. Social media platforms are not the only actors to use such imagining, mobile-based platforms do the same. Network providers, handset manufacturers, and social media platforms each promote social activities of togetherness enabled by their products which evidences a sustained cultural norm of sharing through teletechnologies for the purpose of affective connectivity". Therefore, such architecture creates even bigger demand in connectivity that is continuously exploited by the online market. As José van Dijck notices, connectivity quickly assumed the connotation of users accumulating social capital, while in fact this term increasingly referred to owners amassing economic capital. As the result, social media gain political and economic importance having the power at the levels of grassroots activists, governments, and corporations.

Example of the application of connectivity 
Facebook can serve as a good example how connectivity is being produced and exploited by social media. Van Dijck mentions three concepts implemented in the technological side of connectivity which result in the connective structure of the platform and in the creation of its additional social and cultural dimensions. These are platform, protocol and interface.  

Several scholars (van Dijck, Gillespie) mention in their works the ambiguity of the term "platform" that promises to bring openness, access, to be neutral and help people build social connections and participate in online activities, but in fact implies a more complicated structure of the media, most of the time created for the profit purposes and as the enhancement of control under the users. As for the protocols and interfaces, the algorithms behind the platform are intransparent and presented to the user as intermediaries for 'staying in touch', being connected, encouraging to make those connections, but at the same time the platform itself  "facilitates the cultivation of 'weak ties' as well as the fabrication of 'strong ties'". Therefore, connectivity becomes a new type of social capital gained from the platform's working principles.

Culture of connectivity

"Culture of connectivity" is the term suggested by the Dutch scholar José van Dijck for defining the contemporary interweaving of the online and offline practices and the omnipresence of social media in modern life. The researcher explained the emergence of this culture as the process that evolved in a rather short period of time and indicated the shift from "networked communication to "performed" sociality, from a participatory culture to culture to connectivity". Moreover, the evolution of this culture was one of the parts of the changing processes that took place in private, corporate and public domains.

See also
 Web 2.0
 Participatory culture
 Sharing economy
 Network economics
 The Wealth of Networks

References

Social media
Media studies
Information Age
Information economy